Filifolium is a genus of flowering plants in the daisy family.

There is only one known species, Filifolium sibiricum, native to Japan, Korea, Mongolia, China (Manchuria, Inner Mongolia, Hebei, Shanxi) and parts of Asiatic Russia (Primorye, Amur, Khabarovsk, Irkutsk, Zabaykalsky Krai, Buryatiya).

References

Anthemideae
Flora of temperate Asia
Monotypic Asteraceae genera